Patricia Hogan Fordyce (born December 21, 1949) is a retired professional tennis player from the U.S. She competed in the Fed Cup a number of times from 1970 to 1973. With compatriot Peggy Michel, she reached the final of the doubles event at the 1969 Wimbledon Championships.

In 1967, she won the All England Plate, a competition for players who were defeated in the first or second rounds of the Wimbledon singles competition. In July 1973, she won the singles title at the North of England Championships in Hoylake, defeating compatriot Sharon Walsh in the final in three sets.

Grand Slam finals

Doubles (1 runner-up)

References

External links
 
 
 
 

1949 births
Living people
American female tennis players
Tennis players from San Diego
21st-century American women